Parkes is an inner southern suburb of the Canberra Central district of Canberra, located within the Australian Capital Territory of Australia. Located south-east of the Canberra central business district, Parkes contains the Parliamentary Triangle and many of the national monuments of Australia's capital city.

Parkes is named in honor of Sir Henry Parkes, a Federalist, legislator and one of the founders of the Australian Constitution. Streets in Parkes are named after monarchs and constitutional references.

Parkes contains many of Canberra's large institutions and contains limited residential areas.

Population

Notable places
 Aboriginal Tent Embassy
 Commonwealth Park
 Commonwealth Place
East Block
 Kings Park
Central Basin of Lake Burley Griffin
 High Court of Australia
 National Carillon
 National Gallery of Australia
 National Library of Australia
 National Portrait Gallery
 National Rose Garden
 Old Parliament House
 Questacon
 Reconciliation Place
Regatta Point
West Block

Geology

The geology of Parkes has been studied in great detail. Canberra Formation, calcareous shale is found in the lower parts.  This overlies middle Silurian Camp Hill Sandstone.  The sandstone unconformably overlies the early Silurian Black Mountain Sandstone and State Circle Shale.  State Circle Shale is Late Llandovery in a more finely divided time scale and it has been dated to 445 ±7 million years old.  The State Circle Shale is composed of laminated shales and siltstone.  Black Mountain Sandstone is composed of a white quartz sandstone.

Education
Parkes residents get preference for:
Forrest Primary
Telopea Park School (for high school)
Narrabundah College

Gallery

See also

 Parliamentary Triangle

References

Suburbs of Canberra